is a Japanese  manga series by Celina Seo. An anime adaptation by ComicFesta was broadcast in January 2019 in two versions.

Plot

Fourth-year college student Kōya Asumi takes a part-time job as a housekeeper and is hired by Keiichi Naruse, a single father. Kōya becomes attracted to Keiichi, and the two begin a relationship.

Characters

Media

Manga

It is serialized digitally on Screamo under their BL Screamo label beginning in May 2017. The chapters were later released in 4 bound volumes by Suiseisha under the Glanz BL Comics imprint.

Anime

In December 2018, ComicFesta announced that they were creating an anime adaptation, and it was slated to debut on January 6, 2019, on Tokyo MX. The anime is produced by Magic Bus, with Misutaka Noshitani as director, Ayumi Saitō as scriptwriter, Taihei Nagai as the character designer, Takahiro Enomoto as the sound direction, and Studio Mausu handling sound production. Like ComicFesta's other series, two versions of the anime were produced: a standard version for television broadcast, and a complete version including sexual content for streaming on ComicFesta Anime's website. The theme song is "Home Sweet Home" by Masahiro Yamanaka and Junta Terashima, the voice actors of Kōya Asumi and Keiichi Naruse. Both versions of the first episode was screened in advance at a promotional event in Lefkada Shinjuku on December 30, 2018.

References

External links
  
 

LGBT in anime and manga
Magic Bus (studio)
Yaoi anime and manga
2010s LGBT literature